Specialization or Specialized may refer to:

Academia 
 Academic specialization, may be a course of study or major at an academic institution or may refer to the field in which a specialist practices
 Specialty (medicine), a branch of medical practice

Biology 
 Cellular differentiation, the process by which a less specialized cell becomes a more specialized cell type
 Specialty (medicine), a branch of medical science
 Generalist and specialist species, in biology and ecology
 Specialization in multicellular organisms

Computer science 
 Partial template specialization, a particular form of class template specialization
 Template specialization, a style of computer programming which allows alternative implementations to be provided based on certain characteristics of the parameterized type that is being instantiated

Economics and industry 
 Departmentalization, refers to the process of grouping activities into departments
 Division of labour, the specialization of cooperative labour in specific, circumscribed tasks and roles
 Economic specialization, the separation of tasks within an economy
 Flexible Specialization (Post-Fordism), a name given to the dominant system of economic production, consumption and associated socio-economic phenomena, in most industrialized countries since the late 20th century
 Network governance, also known as Flexible Specialization

Linguistics 
 Specialization (linguistics)
 Specialized English, a controlled version of the English language used for radio broadcasting, easier for non-native speakers

Mathematics 
 Specialization (pre)order, a natural preorder on the set of the points of a topological space
 Ring of symmetric functions#Specializations, an algebra homomorphism from the ring of symmetric functions to a commutative algebra.

Organizations 
 SCT Logistics, transport company in Australia that formally traded as Specialised Container Transport
 Specialised Technical Committees of the African Union
 Specialized Technology Resources, an American corporation headquartered in Enfield, Connecticut
 Specialized System Consultants, a private media company that publishes magazines and reference manuals
 Specialized Bicycle Components, a company making bicycles and bicycle components

Psychology 
 Cognitive specialization, refers to the theory that learning certain skills inhibits the ability to learn related but dissimilar skills
 Specialization of knowledge 
 Interactive specialization, a theory of brain development

Other uses 
 Specialized Mobile Radio, analog or digital trunked two-way radio system

See also 
 Specialist (disambiguation)